The men's team double regu sepak takraw competition at the 2018 Asian Games was held at Ranau Sports Hall, Palembang, Indonesia from 23 to 25 August 2018. Men's team doubles competition was held for the first time in the Asian Games history.

Squads

Results
All times are Western Indonesia Time (UTC+07:00)

Preliminary

Group A

|-
|rowspan=2|23 August||rowspan=2|09:00
|rowspan=2 align=right|
|rowspan=2 align=center|1–2
|rowspan=2 align=left|
|colspan=3|2–0 ||colspan=3|0–2 ||colspan=3|0–2
|-
|21–19||21–15|| ||19–21||19–21|| ||15–21||19–21||
|-
|rowspan=2|23 August||rowspan=2|09:00
|rowspan=2 align=right|
|rowspan=2 align=center|1–2
|rowspan=2 align=left|
|colspan=3|2–1 ||colspan=3|0–2 ||colspan=3|0–2
|-
|21–19||18–21||21–17||18–21||18–21|| ||14–21||12–21||
|-
|rowspan=2|23 August||rowspan=2|15:00
|rowspan=2 align=right|
|rowspan=2 align=center|2–1
|rowspan=2 align=left|
|colspan=3|2–0 ||colspan=3|2–0 ||colspan=3|0–2
|-
|21–17||21–16|| ||21–6||21–9|| ||23–25||20–22||
|-
|rowspan=2|23 August||rowspan=2|15:00
|rowspan=2 align=right|
|rowspan=2 align=center|2–1
|rowspan=2 align=left|
|colspan=3|1–2 ||colspan=3|2–0 ||colspan=3|2–1
|-
|14–21||25–23||17–21||21–18||21–19|| ||21–14||10–21||21–12
|-
|rowspan=2|24 August||rowspan=2|09:00
|rowspan=2 align=right|
|rowspan=2 align=center|3–0
|rowspan=2 align=left|
|colspan=3|2–0 ||colspan=3|2–0 ||colspan=3|2–0
|-
|21–18||22–20|| ||21–19||21–12|| ||23–21||21–14||
|-
|rowspan=2|24 August||rowspan=2|09:00
|rowspan=2 align=right|
|rowspan=2 align=center|2–1
|rowspan=2 align=left|
|colspan=3|2–0 ||colspan=3|1–2 ||colspan=3|2–0
|-
|21–17||21–19|| ||21–18||10–21||24–25||21–14||21–10||
|-

Group B

|-
|rowspan=2|23 August||rowspan=2|09:00
|rowspan=2 align=right|
|rowspan=2 align=center|2–1
|rowspan=2 align=left|
|colspan=3|1–2 ||colspan=3|2–0 ||colspan=3|2–0
|-
|18–21||21–12||17–21||21–13||21–18|| ||21–19||21–13||
|-
|rowspan=2|23 August||rowspan=2|15:00
|rowspan=2 align=right|
|rowspan=2 align=center|2–1
|rowspan=2 align=left|
|colspan=3|0–2 ||colspan=3|2–0 ||colspan=3|2–0
|-
|17–21||8–21|| ||21–18||22–20|| ||21–15||21–13||
|-
|rowspan=2|24 August||rowspan=2|09:00
|rowspan=2 align=right|
|rowspan=2 align=center|3–0
|rowspan=2 align=left|
|colspan=3|2–0 ||colspan=3|2–0 ||colspan=3|2–0
|-
|21–12||21–14|| ||21–10||21–10|| ||21–10||21–14||
|-

Knockout round

Semifinals

|-
|rowspan=2|24 August||rowspan=2|15:00
|rowspan=2 align=right|
|rowspan=2 align=center|0–2
|rowspan=2 align=left|
|colspan=3|0–2 ||colspan=3|1–2 ||colspan=3|
|-
|10–21||19–21|| ||17–21||21–10||17–21|| || ||
|-
|rowspan=2|24 August||rowspan=2|15:00
|rowspan=2 align=right|
|rowspan=2 align=center|2–0
|rowspan=2 align=left|
|colspan=3|2–0 ||colspan=3|2–1 ||colspan=3|
|-
|21–19||21–10|| ||21–11||20–22||21–16|| || ||
|-

Gold medal match

|-
|rowspan=2|25 August||rowspan=2|09:00
|rowspan=2 align=right|
|rowspan=2 align=center|0–2
|rowspan=2 align=left|
|colspan=3|0–2 ||colspan=3|1–2 ||colspan=3|
|-
|18–21||18–21|| ||18–21||21–18||14–21|| || ||
|-

References

External links
Sepak takraw at the 2018 Asian Games

Sepak takraw at the 2018 Asian Games